Inter-satellite service  (also: inter-satellite radiocommunication service) is – according to Article 1.22 of the International Telecommunication Union's (ITU) Radio Regulations (RR) – defined as «A radiocommunication service providing links between artificial satellites.

Classification
In accordance with ITU Radio Regulations (article 1) variations of this radiocommunication service are classified as follows:
 Fixed service (article 1.20)
 Fixed-satellite service (article 1.21)
 Inter-satellite service (article 1.22)
 Earth exploration-satellite service (article 1.51)
 Meteorological-satellite service (article 1.52)

Satellites

Inter-satellite radiocommunications satellites
 U.S. Tracking and Data Relay Satellite
 Artemis (satellite)
 European Data Relay System
 Indian Data Relay Satellite System
 Luch (satellite) (Russia)
 Tianlian I (China)

Commercial satellite constellations with inter-satellite communication
 Iridium
 Starlink

See also
 Communications satellite
 Radio station
 Wireless mesh network
 Laser communication in space

References / sources 

 International Telecommunication Union (ITU)
 Earth exploration-satellite service. ITU, Genf 2011. 

Radiocommunication services ITU